The following is a list of transfers for the 2021–22 Indian Super League season. The list includes both pre-season and mid-season transfers.

Transfers 
All clubs without a flag are participating in the Indian Super League.

See also 

 Indian Super League
 2021–22 Indian Super League season

References 

Lists of Indian Super League transfers
2021–22 in Indian football
India
2021–22 Indian Super League season